Dražen Bogopenec (fl. 1306–1307) was a county lord (župan) in Zagorje, a region in Kalinovik (between Kalinovik, Konjic and Nevesinje), in Hum (today part of Herzegovina). Zagorje was part of eastern Hum, which at the time was a province of the Serbian Kingdom under Stephen Uroš II Milutin, while western Hum had been taken by Paul I Šubić of Bribir, the Ban of Croatia, amid the dynastic civil war between Stephen Uroš II Milutin and Stephen Dragutin of Syrmia.

He was born in Nevesinje, in the middle of the 13th century. Bogopenec was a member of the prominent Bogopanković family, of which history little is known about. He and his associate župan Poznan Purćić plundered in Hum; Bogopenec is mentioned for the first time in Ragusan documents, in the Diversa Cancellarie from the year 1306; (dated to 20 or 24 May) when Ragusan nobleman Toma Držić (Thomadus de Dersa) complained to the Republic about the plundering and hijacking of a cargo filled with textile goods from Večerić, worth 800 perpers, in which Bogopenec participated in. Later, on 7 January 1307, a Đurko gave his testimony to the Ragusan knez and judges that he had been in Broćna, in Hum, when Nikifor Ranjina sued Bogopenec, Purćić and Aljen Bogavčić, and their associates, in front of knez Konstantin. The charged party returned some of the goods, and the rest they took from their properties and people. Bogopenec, Purćić and Bogavčić were the most powerful nobility of Hum in the beginning of the 14th century. Bogopenec' family gained a wider region in the 1330s, after the removal of Purćić.

Bogopenec was the founder of the House of Sanković and was the father of župan Milten Draživojević, who was in the service of Stephen II, Ban of Bosnia.

|-

Annotations

References

Sources

Matica Srpska, Biografije, СРПСКИ БИОГРАФСКИ РЕЧНИК, Азбучник, III том, Д ‐ З (in Serbian)

 

14th-century Serbian nobility
People of the Kingdom of Serbia (medieval)
14th-century Bosnian people 
People of the Banate of Bosnia
Glavatičevo
Sanković noble family